Alexander Smith White (born 3 November 1950) is a Scottish former footballer who played as a left winger.

Career 
White began his professional career with Dundee United alongside his identical twin brother Joe, with the siblings playing together for the first time on 18 December 1971 in a 3–0 defeat away to Aberdeen (they were the first pair of twins to play for the club).

White spent three years at Tannadice before moving to Forfar Athletic in 1975, where he went on to make over sixty league appearances. In 1978, White left the senior game and returned to Glenrothes, rejoining his brother who had returned to the Fife Junior club four years earlier.

References

1950 births
Living people
Association football wingers
British identical twins
Scottish footballers
Dundee United F.C. players
Forfar Athletic F.C. players
Glenrothes F.C. players
Footballers from Fife
People from Ballingry
Scottish Football League players
Scottish Junior Football Association players
Scottish twins
Twin sportspeople